Nogoom Football Club (formerly Nogoom El Mostakbal Football Club (is an Egyptian football club based in October, Giza, Egypt. The club currently plays in the Egyptian Second Division, the second-highest league in the Egyptian football league system.

History
After the success of the Pepsi League for students of schools led by Egyptian businessman Mohamed El Tawila since its establishment in 2003. El Tawila thought of creating Nogoom El Mostakbal club to provide young talent with the opportunity to develop and compete in a football trip in 2006.

Nogoom El Mostakbal club has become one of the leading youth development clubs in Egypt and continues to assert its mission to bring new talents to Egyptian football.

The first official participation of Nogoom El Mostakbal in the Egyptian Championships was the 2007–08 season in the Giza Area U-18 Championship and won the championship, and Participate in the Giza Area U-15 Championship.

The club rebranded as Nogoom FC in July 2018. The "of the Future" part of the name was removed as the club has reached the Egyptian Premier League.

Performance in the Egyptian Premier League

Current squad

First Team Squad

On Loan

Current technical staff

References

Egyptian Second Division
Football clubs in Cairo
Football clubs in Egypt
2006 establishments in Egypt
Association football clubs established in 2006